The 147th New York State Legislature, consisting of the New York State Senate and the New York State Assembly, met from January 2 to April 11, 1924, during the second year of Al Smith's second tenure as Governor of New York, in Albany.

Background
Under the provisions of the New York Constitution of 1894, re-apportioned in 1917, 51 Senators and 150 assemblymen were elected in single-seat districts; senators for a two-year term, assemblymen for a one-year term. The senatorial districts consisted either of one or more entire counties; or a contiguous area within a single county. The counties which were divided into more than one senatorial district were New York (nine districts), Kings (eight), Bronx (three), Erie (three), Monroe (two), Queens (two) and Westchester (two). The assembly districts were made up of contiguous area, all within the same county.

At this time there were two major political parties: the Republican Party and the Democratic Party. The Socialist Party also nominated tickets.

Elections
The New York state election, 1923, was held on November 6. The only statewide elective office up for election was a judgeship on the New York Court of Appeals which was carried by Democrat Irving Lehman who had been endorsed by the Republicans.

No women were elected to the Legislature.

Sessions
The Legislature met for the regular session at the State Capitol in Albany on January 2, 1924; and adjourned in the morning of April 11.

H. Edmund Machold (Rep.) was re-elected Speaker.

State Senate

Districts

Members
The asterisk (*) denotes members of the previous Legislature who continued in office as members of this Legislature.

Note: For brevity, the chairmanships omit the words "...the Committee on (the)..."

Employees
 Clerk: Dominick F. Mullaney 
 Sergeant-at-Arms: Ralph D. Paoli
 Assistant Sergeant-at-Arms: 
 Principal Doorkeeper: 
 First Assistant Doorkeeper: 
 Stenographer: Michael Degnan

State Assembly

Assemblymen
Note: For brevity, the chairmanships omit the words "...the Committee on (the)..."

Employees
 Clerk: Fred W. Hammond

Notes

Sources
 Members of the New York Assembly (1920s) at Political Graveyard
 HUTCHINSON HEADS INSURANCE COMMITTEE AND MADE MEMBER OF IMPORTANT WAYS AND MEANS in The Morning Herald, of Gloversville, on January 8, 1924 (pg. 8)

147
1924 in New York (state)
1924 U.S. legislative sessions